Semystra or Semestra was a nymph, in Greek mythology.

Mythology 
Semystra nurtured Keroessa, daughter of Io and Zeus. Keroessa's mother gave birth at Semystra's altar and left the baby there in order to protect her from Hera. Semystra found the infant and raised her.

According to a legend, Semystra was also the mother of Byzas, who was the founder of Byzantium.

The city of Semystra was named after her and there was an altar of her there.

References

Nymphs